{{Infobox settlement
| official_name = Ilulissat
| other_name = 
| image_skyline =  
| image_caption = From upper left: Illumiut neighbourhood, Old town, Ilulissat Icefjord, Knud Rasmussen's Museum, Zion's Church
| image_flag = Flag of Ilulissat.svg
| blank_flag_type = 
| blank_flag_size = 
| image_blank_emblem =
| blank_emblem_type = Coat of arms
| blank_emblem_size = 100px
| blank_emblem_link =  Avannaata
| pushpin_map             = Greenland#North Atlantic#Arctic
| pushpin_relief          = yes
| pushpin_label_position  = 
| pushpin_map_caption     = Location within Greenland
| pushpin_mapsize         = 
| image_map= 
| image_map1=
| image_shield            = Coat of arms Ilulissat.svg
| shield_size             =
| subdivision_type        = Sovereign state
| subdivision_name        = 
| subdivision_type1       = Autonomous territory
| subdivision_name1       = 
| subdivision_type2       = Municipality
| subdivision_name2       =   Avannaata
| established_title = First mention
| established_date = 15th century
| established_title1 = City Status
| established_date1 = 16th century
| area_total_km2 = 11.25
| area_metro_km2 = 47.00
| area_footnotes = 
| population_footnotes = 
| population_as_of = 2020 (city, settlements)
| population_total = 4670
| population_blank2_title = Ethnicity
| population_blank2 = 90.98% Greenlandic9.02% Other<ref name="BEDST3">Naatsorsueqqissaartarfik: Naatsorsueqqissaartarfik, table BEDST3', period 2014</ref>
| population_density_km2 = auto
| population_urban = 4,491 (City of Ilulissat)
| population_metro = 342 (Settlements: Ilimanaq, Oqaatsut, Qeqertaq and Saqqaq)
| population_density_metro_km2 = 103.5
| timezone = WGT
| utc_offset = -3
| timezone_DST = WGST
| utc_offset_DST = -2
| elevation_min_m = 1
| elevation_max_m = 2010
| area_code = (+299) 94
| postal_code_type = Postal code
| postal_code = 3952
| coordinates             = 
| coordinates_footnotes   = 
| website = 
}}

With the population of 4,670 as of 2020, it is the third-largest city in Greenland, after Nuuk and Sisimiut. 
The city is home to almost as many sled-dogs as people.

In direct translation, Ilulissat is the Kalaallisut word for "Icebergs". The nearby Ilulissat Icefjord is a UNESCO World Heritage Site, and has made Ilulissat the most popular tourist destination in Greenland. Tourism is now the town's principal industry.
The city neighbours the Ilulissat Icefjord, where there are enormous icebergs from the most productive glacier in the northern hemisphere.

History

The town was established as a trading post by Jacob Severin's company in 1741 and was named in his honor.Kjærgaard, Kathrine (2010). "Grønland som del af den bibelske fortælling – en 1700-tals studie " ["Greenland as Part of the Biblical Narrative – a Study of the 18th Century"]. Kirkehistoriske Samlinger, 51-130. 

The Zion Church (Zions Kirke) was built in the late 18th century, and was the largest man-made structure in Greenland at the time. The final resident of nearby Sermermiut moved to Ilulissat in 1850.

Ilulissat Declaration

The town was the site of the Arctic Ocean Conference in May 2008. The joint meeting between Canada, Denmark, Norway, Russia, and the United States was held to discuss key issues relating to territorial claims in the Arctic (particularly Hans Island - eventually settled in 2022 -, and Arktika 2007) and Arctic shrinkage produced by climate change.

The Ilulissat Declaration arose from the conference. It stated that the law of the sea provided for important rights and obligations concerning the delineation of the outer limits of the continental shelf, the protection of the marine environment (including ice-covered areas), freedom of navigation, marine scientific research, and other uses of the sea. It also said that it remained committed to this legal framework and to the orderly settlement of any possible overlapping claims.

With this existing legal framework providing a solid foundation for responsible management, there was no need to develop a new comprehensive international legal regime to govern the Arctic Ocean. The states involved would continue the developments within the Arctic Ocean and continue to implement appropriate measures to further said developments.

Hotel Ilulissat Fire
On 7 March 2021 at 20.12 (local time) a major fire broke out in Hotel Ilulissat, which at the time was still under construction. The fire and smoke was seen throughout the city. Police asked everyone in the area to stay home and keep their windows closed, until the fire fighters ended the fire. The police in Nuuk are to start an investigation.
Not long after the fire fighters arrived, a gas cylinder exploded. The explosion was heard throughout the city.

Geography and environment

The Ilulissat Icefjord southeast of Ilulissat was declared a UNESCO World Heritage Site in 2004.

Ilulissat has a tundra climate (ET) with long, cold winters and short, cool summers. Ilulissat is one of the driest settlements in Greenland, receiving only  of precipitation. Ilulissat is also one of the sunniest settlements in Greenland, especially during summer. Interestingly, March is the coldest month in Ilulissat despite similar locations experiencing February as the coldest month of the year.

 Population 
With 4,670 inhabitants in 2020, Ilulissat is the largest town in the Avannaata municipality. The population increased over 8% relative to 1990 levels but has remained steady since around 2003.

Tourist Attraction
 Ilulissat Art Museum

Transport

Air

It serves Ilulissat with connections to towns in northwestern and midwestern Greenland via Air Greenland. Service to Reykjavík, Iceland, began in April 2011 via Air Iceland Connect and Air Greenland in 2017.

Sea
The Arctic Umiaq ferry links Ilulissat with Sisimiut, Nuuk, and other towns and settlements on the western and southwestern coast of Greenland.

Sport
The town is home to Nagdlunguaq-48 who play in the Greenlandic Men's Football Championship, Greenland's top soccer competition. Nagdlunguaq-48, who play all their league games in Nuuk, have won the championship ten times (as of 2016).

Film
The fourth series of the Danish TV series Borgen (2022) plays partially in the city of Ilulissat and was filmed on location. It was also the location for the filming of Smilla's Sense of Snow'' (1997).

Notable people
Knud Rasmussen (1879–1933), noted polar explorer and anthropologist, referred to as the "father of Eskimology". Born in Ilulissat, Rasmussen was the first man to cross the Northwest Passage via dog sled. He remains well known in Greenland, Denmark and among Canadian Inuit.
 Jørgen Brønlund (1877–1907), was also a polar explorer born in Ilulissat, He grew up with Rasmussen and accompanied him, along with Harald Moltke and Ludvig Mylius-Erichsen, on the Danish Literary Expedition (1902–1904) to examine Inuit culture. In 1906 he joined Mylius-Erichsen and Peter Høegh Hagen on the Danmark-ekspeditionen to map the northernmost regions of Greenland. Jørgen Brønlund Fjord in Peary Land is named after him.
 Jens Rosing (1925–2008), a Greenlandic artist notable for designing the coat of arms of Greenland, numerous Greenlandic postage stamps, as well as illustrated children's books and water colours − was born in Ilulissat.
 Ricky Enø Jørgensen, racing cyclist.

International Relations

Twin Towns – Sister Cities

Ilulissat is twinned or cooperating with several towns and cities, including:

  Fredericia, Denmark
  Fuglafjørður, Faroe Islands
  Hafnarfjörður, Iceland

Gallery

References

External links

Overviews and data
 
 Daily updated satellite images from Ilulissat Icefjord & Disko Bay

Government
 Avannaata Official municipal and city website

Maps
 
 Satellite image of Retreating Terminus of the Ilulissat Glacier at the NASA Earth Observatory.

News and media
 Google news Ilulissat
 Ilulissat museum and archive
 GEUS Maps of the Ilulissat area

Travel
 Kangia - Ilulissat Icefjord Official website
 Ilulissat entry at Visit Greenland – the official Greenlandic Tourist Board tourism website
 A Photographer's View of Ilulissat & Disko Bay Documentary produced by Florent Piovesan

 
Disko Bay
Populated places in Greenland
Populated places established in 1741
Populated places of Arctic Greenland
Cities and towns in Greenland
Municipal seats of Greenland
Populated coastal places in Greenland
Port cities and towns in Greenland